Heme binding protein 1 is a protein that in humans is encoded by the HEBP1 gene.

Function 
The full-length protein encoded by this gene is an intracellular tetrapyrrole-binding protein. This protein includes a natural chemoattractant peptide of 21 amino acids at the N-terminus, which is a natural ligand for formyl peptide receptor-like receptor 2 (FPRL2) and promotes calcium mobilization and chemotaxis in monocytes and dendritic cells.

References

Further reading